Anahita Hemmati (born July 23, 1973) is an Iranian actress.

Career
Upon finishing high school, Hemmati attended drama classes and made her stage debut with the play ‘Tanbour Players’, by Hadi Marzban, in 1995.

Hemmati has performed in the series ‘Khazra High School’ (1996), ‘Sheriff’ (2005), ‘Sweet and Sour’ (2007), ‘Homeless’ (2004), and ‘The Colonel’s Garden’ (2013).

She has also acted in the movies ‘Love is not Enough’ (1998), ‘A Girl Named Tondar’ (2000), ‘Wooden Ladder’ (2001), ‘How Much You Want to Cry?’ (2005), ‘Excited Hearts’ (2002) and ‘A Pocket Full of Money’ (2009).

References

External links

Living people
1973 births
People from Tehran
Actresses from Tehran
Iranian film actresses
Iranian stage actresses
Iranian television actresses
20th-century Iranian actresses
21st-century Iranian actresses